Paradise (Grenadian Creole: Pawadis) is a town in Saint Andrew's Parish, Grenada. It is located in the east of the island, between Grenville and Dunfermline.

References 

Populated places in Grenada
Saint Andrew Parish, Grenada